Xinrong may refer to the following locations in China:

Xinrong District (新荣区), Datong, Shanxi
Xinrong, Xinrong District (新荣镇), town in Shanxi
Xinrong, Guangxi (新荣镇), town in Beiliu
Xinrong, Tibet, village